This is a list of properties and districts in Rockdale County, Georgia that are listed on the National Register of Historic Places (NRHP).

Current listings

|}

References

Rockdale
Buildings and structures in Rockdale County, Georgia